Tatyana Mikhailovna Gudkova (born 11 January 1993) is a Russian épée fencer, gold medallist in the 2017 World Championships.

References

External links
 
  (archive)
 

1993 births
Living people
Russian female épée fencers
Sportspeople from Smolensk
World Fencing Championships medalists
21st-century Russian women